SSEP may refer to:
 Slim Shady EP, American singer and rapper Eminem's first extended play (1997)
 Somatosensory evoked potential,  means of assessing the somatosensory system
 Student Spaceflight Experiments Program, an educational program in which student experiments are flown in space
 Swiss Society of Experimental Pharmacology (see Life Sciences Switzerland)